The 1925 Kentucky Derby was the 51st running of the Kentucky Derby. The race was run on May 16, 1925.

Payout
The Kentucky Derby Payout Schedule

Field

Winning Breeder: John E. Madden (KY)

Margins – 1 1/2 lengths
Time – 2:07 3/5
Track – Sloppy

References

Kentucky Derby races
Kentucky Derby, 1925
Derby
Kentucky Derby